The following is a list of notable people with the surname Biasi:

Dario Biasi (born 1979), Italian footballer
Gianni De Biasi (born 1956), Italian football coach and former player
Giuseppe Biasi (1885–1945), Italian painter
Nikolai Biasi (1893–1973) Soviet general of Italian descent
Renato Biasi (born 1966), Italian footballer
Stefano Pietri Biasi (born 1985), Italian footballer
Gino Biasi (1931–2016), Italian businessman
Leonardo Biasi (born 1972), Brazilian businessman